The 2008–09 Cornell Big Red women's ice hockey team represented Cornell University in the 2008–09 NCAA Division I women's hockey season. Doug Derraugh was in his fourth season as head coach. He is assisted by Danielle Bilodeau and Kim Insalaco. The seniors on the team are Emma Chipman, Brianne Gilbert and Steph Ulrich.

Preseason
In the preseason coaches poll, Cornell was selected to finish fifth in the ECAC. Harvard led the poll with 10 first-place votes. Rebecca Johnston was honoured with a spot on the 2008 ECAC Preseason All-League team.
October 5: The Big Red hockey players raised over $1,600 for the American Cancer Society's Making Strides Against Breast Cancer.

Regular season
January 13: The Big Red beat Union by a score of 3–0. Every Cornell player had at least one shot on goal. Senior Brianne Gilbert led the team in shots with 8. The Big Red had 50 shots for the first time since the 05–06 season. On February 5, 2006, Cornell had 58 shots against Union.
By mid-February, sophomore Rebecca Johnston was leading the Big Red with 37 points. Johnston's 37 points leads the entire ECAC league in overall points. She is also second in the league and sixth in the NCAA in points per game with 1.85. Johnston's total was the most points in a season for Cornell since the 1991–92 campaign. In that season, senior Kim Ratushny scored 38 points. Freshman Catherine White was second on the team in scoring (34 points). White's point total is fourth in ECAC scoring. White has recorded the most points by a rookie since Dana Antal (36 points, 17 goals, 19 assists) in the 1995–96 season.
The Big Red's games against Harvard (February 13) and Dartmouth (February 14) were part of a promotion between ECAC Hockey and the American Cancer Society called Pink at the Rink. Cornell wore pink jerseys and honored its three seniors after Saturday's match.

International
 Rebecca Johnston was a member of Canada's Under-22 Team. The U-22 participated in the MLP Cup, held in Ravensburg, Germany from Jan. 2–6, 2009. Johnston was part of the silver medal winning team. In the tournament, Johnston accumulated seven points (3 goals, 4 assists). Her best game was in an 11–0 victory over Russia. Johnston scored a hat trick and added an assist. In addition to the MLP Cup, Johnston played with the Canadian Senior Team in the Four Nations Cup between Nov. 4–9, 2009. Johnston was part of the silver medal winning team.

Player stats

Skaters

Goaltenders

Awards and honors
Rebecca Johnston, 2008 ECAC Women's Hockey Preseason All-League team
Rebecca Johnston, Forward, 2009 First Team All-ECAC 
Catherine White, 2009 ECAC Rookie of the Year

References

External links
Cornell Official site
Cornell ECAC hockey site

Cornell
Cornell Big Red women's ice hockey seasons
Cornell
Cornell